Govenia floridana, the Florida govenia, is an extinct species of orchid that was endemic to Everglades National Park in Florida. It was discovered for the first time in 1957, with a total populations of 25 individuals, and the last verified report was from the same site in 1964, where the population had declined to just 10 individuals. It is likely that poaching of plants contributed to its decline and extinction.

Description
Flowers were white with purple spots. It grows in deeply shaded tropical hardwood hammock habitat in Everglades National Park.

References

External links
Atlas of Florida Vascular Plants
North American Orchid Conservation Center
IUCN Red List of Threatened Species

floridana
Orchids of Florida
Plants described in 2000
Everglades National Park
Endemic flora of the United States